The Arizona Territorial Legislature was the legislative body of Arizona Territory. It was a bicameral legislature consisting of a lower house, the House of Representatives, and an upper house, the council. Created by the Arizona Organic Act, the legislature initially consisted of nine members in the council and eighteen members in the House.  The legislature initially met once a year, but this was changed by the U.S. Congress to biannually in 1869.  In 1881, the membership was expanded to twelve Council members and twenty-four Representatives.

The Arizona Territorial Legislature was replaced by the Arizona State Legislature after Arizona achieved statehood.

Legislative sessions

See also
 Members of the Arizona Territorial Legislature

References

External links
 

 
Legislature
Territorial Legislature
Former territorial legislatures of the United States
Arizona Territory
1864 establishments in Arizona Territory
1909 disestablishments in Arizona Territory